Barry Douglas Jackson (born August 22, 1941) is a retired track and field runner from England.

Athletics career
He helped Britain win the silver medal in the men's 4 x 400 metres at the 1962 European Championships in Belgrade, Yugoslavia, alongside Ken Wilcock, Adrian Metcalfe and Robbie Brightwell.

He represented England and won a silver medal in the 4 × 440 yards relay at the 1962 British Empire and Commonwealth Games in Perth, Western Australia.

References

External links
 Profile at Sporting Heroes
 

English male sprinters
Athletes (track and field) at the 1960 Summer Olympics
Olympic athletes of Great Britain
1941 births
Living people
Place of birth missing (living people)
European Athletics Championships medalists
Commonwealth Games medallists in athletics
Commonwealth Games silver medallists for England
Athletes (track and field) at the 1962 British Empire and Commonwealth Games
Medallists at the 1962 British Empire and Commonwealth Games